Ishtiaq Ahmed (born 20 December 1962) is a Pakistani field hockey player. He was born in Sheikhupura. He won a gold medal at the 1984 Summer Olympics in Los Angeles.

References

External links
 

1962 births
Living people
Field hockey players from Sheikhupura
Pakistani male field hockey players
Olympic field hockey players of Pakistan
Field hockey players at the 1984 Summer Olympics
Field hockey players at the 1988 Summer Olympics
Olympic gold medalists for Pakistan
Olympic medalists in field hockey
Medalists at the 1984 Summer Olympics
Asian Games gold medalists for Pakistan
Asian Games silver medalists for Pakistan
Medalists at the 1982 Asian Games
Medalists at the 1986 Asian Games
Asian Games medalists in field hockey
Field hockey players at the 1982 Asian Games
Field hockey players at the 1986 Asian Games
20th-century Pakistani people